Jennifer Innis (sometimes spelled Inniss; born 21 November 1959) is a Guyanese and American former sprinter and long jumper. Innis represented Guyana at the 1979 Pan American Games. She competed in the women's 100 metres and long jump at the 1980 Summer Olympics.  Innis was a finalist in the 1983 World Championships long jump, finishing eleventh. For thirty years, she held the Guyanese women's national record for 100 meters at 11.26 seconds until it was surpassed by Brenessa Thompson in 2017 with a time of 11.14 seconds.

She was the model for the female bronze statue outside the Los Angeles Coliseum created by sculptor Robert Graham for the 1984 Summer Olympic Games. Innis competed in the long jump at the 1984 Summer Olympics.

Innis then represented the United States at the 1987 Pan American Games, winning a silver medal in the long jump. At the 1987 World Championships long jump, she finished seventh. At the 1989 World Indoor Championships, she placed eighth.

At the 1990 Goodwill Games in Seattle, her final international event, she placed fifth in the long jump.

References

External links
 
 1984 Olympics statues

1959 births
Living people
Athletes (track and field) at the 1980 Summer Olympics
Athletes (track and field) at the 1984 Summer Olympics
Guyanese female sprinters
Guyanese female long jumpers
American female long jumpers
Olympic athletes of Guyana
World Athletics Championships athletes for Guyana
Athletes (track and field) at the 1979 Pan American Games
Athletes (track and field) at the 1987 Pan American Games
Pan American Games silver medalists for the United States
Pan American Games medalists in athletics (track and field)
World Athletics Championships athletes for the United States
Guyanese emigrants to the United States
California State University, Los Angeles alumni
Afro-Guyanese people
Place of birth missing (living people)
Competitors at the 1990 Goodwill Games
Medalists at the 1987 Pan American Games
21st-century American women